The Parliament of the Czech Republic or just Parliament is the legislative body of the Czech Republic, seated in Malá Strana, Prague.

It consists of two chambers, both elected in direct elections:
 the Upper House: Senate
 the Lower House: Chamber of Deputies

Art. 15 of the Constitution stipulates its name as the "Parliament". The Parliament exercises competences usual in parliamentary systems: it holds and passes bills, has the right to modify the Constitution, ratifies international agreements; if necessary, it declares war, approves presence of foreign military forces in the Czech Republic or a dispatch of Czech military forces abroad.

History 

The tradition of modern parliamentarianism in the Bohemian lands dates back to times of the Austrian Empire (and then Cisleithanian part of Austria-Hungary), where the Imperial Council (Reichsrat, Říšská rada) was created in 1861.

After proclamation of Czechoslovakia in 1918 its National Assembly (Národní shromáždění) undertook legislative duties both of the Imperial Council and State Diets (Bohemian, Moravian, Silesian). In 1938–39 and between 1948–89 there existed a parliament within non-democratic regimes (right-wing authoritarian or Communist regime, respectively). As a consequence of federalization of Czechoslovakia (1968), national councils of Czech and Slovak parts of the country were created.

The Chamber of Deputies keeps continuity with the Czech National Council (Česká národní rada), while the Senate was established in 1996 (with reference to the First Czechoslovak Republic one).

External links  
 psp.cz (official site)

Notes

References 

 
Politics of the Czech Republic
Government of the Czech Republic
Czech Republic
Czech Republic
Czech